Orthocomotis albimarmorea is a species of moth of the family Tortricidae. It is found in Morona-Santiago Province, Ecuador.

The ground colour of the white, sprinkled with black and sparsely scaled with green and reddish beyond the median cell. The markings are black. The hindwings are whitish grey, suffused with grey and strigulated (finely streaked) with dark grey. The periphery is dark grey.

Etymology
The species name refers to the whitish marble-like markings on the forewings.

References

Moths described in 2006
Orthocomotis